Gnathamitermes perplexus, the long-jawed desert termites, is a species of termite in the family Termitidae. It is found in Central America and North America. The species creates tunnels, with both colony founders and workers transporting sand to excavate tunnels using their mandibles.  The species is particularly susceptible to infectious nematodes such as Steinernema riobrave.

References

Further reading

 

Termites
Articles created by Qbugbot
Insects described in 1920